James Fisher (5 February 1816, Crawford County, Pennsylvania – 1 January 1901, Crawford County, Wisconsin) was a member of the Wisconsin State Senate and the Wisconsin State Assembly. Fisher represented the 3rd District of the Senate during the 1849 and 1850 sessions. Later, he was a member of the Assembly during the 1855, 1863 and 1868 sessions. He was a Democrat.

References

External links
The Political Graveyard

1816 births
1901 deaths
People from Crawford County, Pennsylvania
People from Crawford County, Wisconsin
19th-century American politicians
Democratic Party members of the Wisconsin State Assembly